Le SuperClub Vidéotron Ltée, which includes the Jumbo Video and Microplay chains, is a Canadian brand of franchised video stores. It is owned by Quebecor Media, with operations concentrated in Quebec. It was the largest video store chain operator in Canada, maintaining corporate-owned stores until 2018. , the brand franchises a total of 14 stores: two SuperClub, two Jumbo Video and ten Microplay stores.

History
In 2004, SuperClub took over the Jumbo Video and Microplay franchises. Jumbo Video operates 17 video rental locations nationwide, while Microplay focuses primarily on video games, but also rents and sells movies. The Microplay name has recently appeared on a number of in-store boutiques at SuperClub locations throughout Quebec. In 2006, most Rogers Video stores in Quebec were closed or converted to Le SuperClub Vidéotron. There are currently 69 Microplay locations and the vast majority of them are co-located with SuperClub locations in Quebec.

As of August 2005, the chain operated more than 185 locations through Quebec under the SuperClub brand. They also have locations in Edmundston, New Brunswick, and Rockland, Ontario. They had also opened locations in Moncton and Fredericton. Those stores were eventually bought out by Rogers and converted into Rogers Video stores.

Their location in Square One Shopping Centre was recently closed down along with many other stores, including Cavendish Mall in Côte Saint-Luc as well as Kirkland, Quebec, Dollard-des-Ormeaux, Beaconsfield, Quebec as well as in Montreal's Pierrefonds-Roxboro borough. They also closed their location in Hawkesbury, Ontario.

Their head office was located in the city of Montreal's Saint-Léonard borough.

Subsidiaries

Microplay
Microplay founder Bill Pearce originally established a shop on Bank Street named Gamer Video in 1981, which rented Atari and Intellivision games; it was one of the first Canadian businesses to rent video game cartridges. Gamer Video was destroyed in a fire in 1983. In 1986, Pearce and childhood friend Mason Copeland opened Microplay. At that time, Pearce and Copeland made weekly trips to the United States to avoid high markups charged by Canadian video game distributors. The store had two locations in Ottawa and one in Toronto by April 1989, and also acted as a supplier to 25 Canadian video game stores. Microplay began franchising in June 1993, expanding to 28 stores, and became regarded as Canada's leading video game specialty chain. Microplay's first United States location opened in Bradenton, Florida in July 1994. By December 1994, Microplay was operating 120 franchisees along with six corporate-owned stores.

Locations
, Le SuperClub Vidéotron listed the following locations as movie rental stores:

 Aylmer
 Boucherville
 Buckingham
 Cap-de-la-Madeleine
 Charlesbourg
 Fabreville
 Gréber 
 Greenfield Park
 Île-Perrot
 Jonquière
 L'Assomption
 Lachine
 Lafontaine
 La Plaine
 Lavaltrie
 Mascouche
 Mont-Laurier 
 Pointe-aux-Trembles
 Roland-Therrien
 Saint-Antoine
 Saint-Constant
 Saint-Eustache
 Saint-Hubert 
 Saint-Jean-sur-Richelieu
 Saint-Lin 
 Saint-Luc
 Saint-Nicolas
 Saint-Romuald
 Victoriaville

 indicates current Le Superclub Vidéotron locations. Both are affiliated with Club Vidéo Flash.
 indicates former Le Superclub Vidéotron locations affiliated with Club Vidéo Flash.

Logos

References

External links
 Superclub Vidéotron / Jumbo Video website
 Club Vidéo Flash (features four Le Superclub Vidéotron locations)
 Microplay website

1989 establishments in Quebec
2021 disestablishments in Quebec
Companies based in Montreal
Quebecor
Retail companies established in 1989
Retail companies disestablished in 2021
Video rental services of Canada